Guido Vignar (born 15 June 1969) is an Italian sailor. He competed in the Star event at the 2004 Summer Olympics.

References

External links
 

1969 births
Living people
Italian male sailors (sport)
Olympic sailors of Italy
Sailors at the 2004 Summer Olympics – Star
People from Locarno